The Suze is a river in the Bernese Jura, Canton of Berne, Switzerland.

Down flow 
It takes its source in a moorland at over 900 metres of altitude, in the high valley of Les Convers, (see:  Renan). It flows down the whole length of the valley of Saint-Imier, (Erguel), leaving it through the gorge of Taubenloch, it flows across the city of Biel/Bienne into the Lake of Bienne, at the altitude of 429 metres, upon a stretch of 45 kilometres. It leaves it through the last leg of the Thielle river,  merging into the Nidau-Büren channel (Aare river), just before the regulating dam Port .

Tributaries
Its main tributaries are la Dou, la Raissette, le Terbez and l'Orvine.

History 
On December 21, 1991, the river has provoked significant flooding along its course: i.e. in Sonceboz, its level had raised by a significant 1.10 meter, with 65 cubic meters of water per second.

References 
 La Suze (site), Canton de Berne, consulted on September 23, 2007

See also
Jura water correction

Rivers of the canton of Bern
Rivers of Switzerland
Rivers of the Jura